Cryptococcus is a genus of scale insects in the family Eriococcidae.

References

External links 

 Cryptococcus on Uniprot.org

Sternorrhyncha genera
Eriococcidae